The 2013 Wake Forest Demon Deacons football team represented Wake Forest University during the 2013 NCAA Division I FBS football season.  The team was coached by Jim Grobe, who coached his 13th season at the school, and played its home games at BB&T Field.  Wake Forest competed in the Atlantic Coast Conference, as they have since the league's inception in 1953, and were in the Atlantic Division. They finished the season 4–8, 2–6 in ACC play to finish in sixth place in the Atlantic Division.

The team introduced two new helmets, a matte black with a gold "WF" logo and a white version of the normal black helmet. The white helmet made its debut against Boston College on September 6. The matte black helmet made its debut on October 5 against rival NC State.

After posting a fifth consecutive losing season, head coach Jim Grobe resigned at the end of the season after a 13-year record of 77–82. On December 10, Wake Forest hired Bowling Green head coach Dave Clawson as Grobe's replacement.

Recruiting
On national signing day, the Demon Deacons received letters of intent from 25 players.

Schedule

Roster

Coaching staff

Game summaries

Presbyterian
12th meeting. 6–4–1 all time. Last meeting 2010, 53–13 Demon Deacons in Winston-Salem.

Boston College
21st meeting. 8–10–2 all time. Last meeting 2012, 28–14 Demon Deacons in Winston-Salem.

Louisiana-Monroe
1st meeting

Army
13th meeting. 8–4 all time. Last meeting 2012, 49–37 Demon Deacons in Winston-Salem.

Clemson
79th meeting. 17–60–1 all time. Last meeting 2012, 42–13 Tigers in Winston-Salem.

NC State
107th meeting. 37–63–6 all time. Last meeting 2012, 37–6 Wolfpack in Raleigh.

Maryland
62nd meeting. 17–43–1 all time. Last meeting 2012, 19–14 Terrapins in College Park.

Miami
11th meeting. 3–7 all time. Last meeting 2009, 28–27 Hurricanes in Winston-Salem.

Syracuse
3rd meeting. 1–1 all time. Last meeting 2011, 36–29 Orange in Syracuse.

Florida State
32nd meeting. 6–24–1 all time. Last meeting 2012, 52–0 Seminoles in Tallahassee.

Duke
94th meeting. 37–54–2 all time. Last meeting 2012, 34–27 Blue Devils in Durham.

Vanderbilt
16th meeting. 6–9 all time. Last meeting 2012, 55–21 Commodores in Winston-Salem.

Statistics

Scores by quarter

Offense

Rushing

Passing

Receiving

Scoring

References

Wake Forest
Wake Forest Demon Deacons football seasons
Wake Forest Demon Deacons football